Sound Collective is a London-based professional music ensemble.

History
Sound Collective, formed in 2003 was a home for classical musicians, who were hand-picked from the British orchestral, chamber and freelance scene.

Sometimes coming together as a chamber orchestra with conductor, but also formed as smaller chamber ensembles, they met just a few times each year to create bespoke performance and education projects.

The guiding principles behind the group were excellence in performance  through adequate rehearsal time, intelligent programming, a democratic ethos in both choice of repertoire and rehearsal approach, and a commitment to communication with their audiences.

References

External links
sound collective official website (link does not exist anymore on 17-01-2021)

London orchestras
Musical groups established in 2003